Canyon Barry (born January 7, 1994) is an American professional basketball player who last played for the Iowa Wolves of the NBA G League. He is the son of Lynn Norenberg Barry and Rick Barry, a Basketball Hall of Fame inductee.

College career
He played college basketball for three years at the College of Charleston in Charleston, South Carolina, as well as one year at the University of Florida in Gainesville, Florida. As a redshirt junior at the College of Charleston, Barry averaged a team-high 19.7 points per game. Following that season, Barry graduated from the College of Charleston Honors College with a bachelor's degree in physics. On May 9, 2016, he announced his transfer to the University of Florida as an immediately-eligible graduate transfer studying nuclear engineering.

He is most notable for this free-throw shooting, as he shoots "granny style," a method his father popularized during his career. Barry had a .883 free throw percentage as a senior. He set a Florida Gators men's basketball school record for consecutive free throws, surpassing Taurean Green's streak of 37 on February 11, 2017. His streak ended at 42 on February 14 on a night when he posted a season-high 30 points against Auburn. He earned NCAA Division I Men's Basketball Academic All-American of the Year recognition in 2017.

Professional career

Vilpas Vikings (2017)
After going undrafted in the 2017 NBA draft, Barry joined the New York Knicks in the NBA Summer League on June 23, 2017.

On August 16, 2017, Barry signed with Finnish club Salon Vilpas Vikings for the 2017–18 season.

Brno (2017–2018)
On December 9, 2017, Barry signed with Brno of the Czech National Basketball League (NBL).

Iowa Wolves (2018–2022)
On October 13, 2018, Barry was signed and then waived by the Minnesota Timberwolves. He was added to the Iowa Wolves opening night roster. During the 2020–21 season, Barry averaged 12.9 points and 3.4 rebounds per game.

References

External links
Florida Gators bio
College of Charleston Cougars bio
 

1994 births
Living people
American expatriate basketball people in the Czech Republic
American expatriate basketball people in Finland
American men's 3x3 basketball players
American men's basketball players
American people of Lithuanian descent
Basketball players from Colorado Springs, Colorado
Basketball players from Fort Wayne, Indiana
BC Brno players
College of Charleston Cougars men's basketball players
Florida Gators men's basketball players
Iowa Wolves players
Shooting guards